Andrea Bédard (born 28 January 1963) is a Canadian former alpine skier who competed in the 1984 Winter Olympics.

References

1963 births
Living people
Canadian female alpine skiers
Olympic alpine skiers of Canada
Alpine skiers at the 1984 Winter Olympics